The suffix -oate is the IUPAC nomenclature used in organic chemistry to form names of compounds formed from carboxylic acids. They are of two types:
Formed by replacing the hydrogen atom in the –COOH by some other radical, usually an alkyl or aryl radical forming an ester.  For example, methyl benzoate is a molecular compound with the structure C6H5–CO–O–CH3, and its condensed structural formula usually written as C6H5COOCH3.
Formed by removing the hydrogen atom in the –COOH, producing an anion, which joins with a cation forming a salt.  For example, the sodium benzoate is an ionic compound with the structure C6H5–CO–O− Na+, and its condensed structural formula usually written as C6H5CO2Na.
The suffix comes from "-oic acid".

The most common examples of compounds named with the "oate" suffix are esters, like ethyl acetate, .

References

oate
English suffixes